Arachnoides placenta is a species of sea urchin of the family Clypeasteridae. Their armour is covered with spines. It is placed in the genus Arachnoides and lives in the sea. Arachnoides placenta was first scientifically described in 1758 by Carl Linnaeus.

See also 
 Aporocidaris milleri
 Aporocidaris usarpi
 Arachnoides tenuis

References 

Clypeasteridae
Animals described in 1758
Taxa named by Carl Linnaeus